Echaniz or Echániz is a surname. Notable people with the surname include:

Alejandro Echaniz (born 1942), Mexican wrestler
Gustavo Pedro Echaniz (born 1955), Argentine footballer
José Echániz (1905–1969), Cuban-born pianist